The Two Ronnies is a British television comedy sketch show starring Ronnie Barker and Ronnie Corbett. It was created by Bill Cotton and aired on BBC1 from April 1971 to December 1987. The usual format included sketches, solo sections, serial stories and musical finales.

Origins
Ronnie Barker and Ronnie Corbett met in 1963 at the Buckstone Club in the Haymarket, London, where Corbett was serving drinks between acting jobs. At the time, Barker was beginning to establish himself as a character actor in the West End and on radio. They were invited by David Frost to appear in his new show, The Frost Report, with John Cleese, but the pair's big break came when they filled in, unprepared and unscripted, for eleven minutes during a technical hitch at a British Academy of Film and Television Arts awards ceremony at the London Palladium in 1970. In the audience was Bill Cotton, the Head of Light Entertainment for the BBC, and Sir Paul Fox, the Controller of BBC1. Cotton was so impressed by the duo that he turned to Fox and asked: "How would you like those two on your network?" Unknown to them the pair had just had the renewal of their contract declined by London Weekend Television of rival network ITV, and so were free to change channels. Barker and Corbett were given their own show by the BBC.

Production

Writing 
The show was based on the complementary personalities of Barker and Corbett, who never became an exclusive pairing, but continued to work independently in television outside of the editions of the Two Ronnies. The show was produced annually between 1971 and 1987. It had many notable writers including Ray Alan, John Cleese, Barry Cryer, Spike Milligan, David Nobbs, David Renwick, Terry Ravenscroft, Eric Idle, John Sullivan, Michael Palin, Terry Jones and Laurie Rowley. In addition, Barker used the pseudonym Gerald Wiley when writing sketches. Barker and Corbett would often structure each show themselves, alongside scriptwriters Ian Davidson and Peter Vincent.

Theme music
The main theme music for the show was composed by Ronnie Hazlehurst. Although opening and closing credits appear to use different themes they are respectively the first & third sections of a longer piece.

Another track associated with the show is the stock track The Detectives by Alan Tew (also known as the theme to 1975 Yorkshire TV series The Hanged Man). This was used for the Charlie Farley & Piggy Malone story Stop You're Killing Me.

Format

Newsdesk
The Two Ronnies always opened and closed at the newsdesk, which featured the Ronnies as newsreaders, reading spoof news items. This gave rise to the famous catchphrase at the end of each show:

Corbett: That's all we've got time for, so it's "Goodnight" from me.

Barker: And it's "Goodnight" from him.

Both: Goodnight!

Sketches 
The show featured comic sketches in which Barker and Corbett appeared both together and separately, with various additions giving the programme the feeling of a variety show. The sketches often involved complex word-play, much of it written by Barker, who also liked to parody officialdom and establishment figures, as well as eccentrics. Corbett appeared quieter, more often acting as a foil for Barker, but remained an important part of the chemistry. Many of the jokes revolved around his lack of height, with him delivering many of them himself: when Barker said that the next part "does suit Ronnie C. right down to the ground", Corbett replied "Mind you, that's not far is it?". Other jokes could be of a sexual nature of the sort found on seaside postcards: for example:
"Tickle your botty with a feather tonight?" (sotto voce)
"I beg your pardon?" (outraged)
"Particularly grotty weather tonight"

Some of the show's material contained elements of surreal or left field humour, in the vein of Monty Python, and was considered edgier and more sophisticated than the more traditional routines of Morecambe and Wise. The duo had formed some time after their peers by which time the comedy world had moved on to satire, absurdist surrealism and the beginnings of alternative humour. Furthermore, there was more comedic parity between the show's two stars, with the diminutive Corbett less of a foil to Barker than Ernie Wise was to Eric Morecambe - they were clear comedic equals.

Notable sketches

 Swedish Made Simple (1974) - In a wood-panelled restaurant, a Swedish waiter simplifies his customer's orders using subtitles where each word is translated to a letter.
 Four Candles (1976) - A hardware shopkeeper becomes increasingly frustrated while misunderstanding what a customer is requesting.
 Mastermind (1980) - A contestant on the quiz show Mastermind answers each question before last. 
 The Sweet Shop (1980) - A sweet shop owner sees the danger of the words 'nothing is too much trouble' through the asks of a pushy customer.
 Crossword (1980) - A simple man struggles out-loud with his simple crossword on a train next to a serious man trying to complete his own intellectual crossword.
 Crossed Lines (1981) - Two men next to each other at supermarket payphones have their conversations unintentionally grouped together.
 Courtroom Quiz (1984) - Patrick Troughton plays a judge overhearing a cross examination that takes the form of quiz show questions. 
 The Sheikh in the Grocery Store (1985) - An Arab man struggles to convey his shopping list to the vendor in a grocery store.

Solo sections
Both Barker and Corbett had their own solo sections on each show. Barker would have his own heavily wordplay-based sketch, often as the head of a ridiculous-sounding organisation (for example, the "Anti-Shoddy Goods Committee"). Likewise, Corbett always had a discursive solo monologue in each show, when he sat in a chair, facing the camera, attempting to tell a simple joke, but constantly distracting himself into relating other humorous incidents. The joke itself was normally deliberately corny; the humour came from Corbett's wild tangents, as well as the anticlimax when he finally reached the punchline.

An example of Ronnie Corbett's humour is this short excerpt from a monologue:

Serial stories
It became a tradition of the shows to have a continuing serial story which progressed through the eight episodes of a series. These were often fairly bawdy tales with special guest stars. The Two Ronnies also starred in two spin-off silent films labelled The Two Ronnies Present..., By the Sea and The Picnic, written by Barker, mainly silent comedies featuring a squabbling upper-class family with a 1920s feel about them.

Hampton Wick (1971)
The very first serial of The Two Ronnies was written by Barker, and began as a pastiche of costume dramas about a governess called Henrietta Beckett, played by Madeline Smith. Barker played a sex-starved aristocrat called Sir Geoffrey, and Corbett played his son Edward, but further into the serial, the Ronnies portrayed a wide variety of other characters, including pick-pockets and royals. At the end it is revealed to be just a dream when she wakes up in Hampton Wick Cottage Hospital after having an accident.

Done to Death (1972)
Piggy Malone (Barker) and Charley Farley (Corbett) are private detectives who investigate a mystery about a murdered family, featuring Sue Lloyd as Blanche Brimstone. As soon as Piggy finds out about the murder in the newspaper, a decision's made that means a trip to the country, and there's a second murder during an unusual gathering. Also featuring are secretary Miss Whizzer and the rest of the Brimstone family, through which the detectives narrow down the culprit. The first seven episodes of Done to Death ended with the words "Only one thing was for certain. There would be very little sleep for anyone that night."

Death Can Be Fatal (1975)
Piggy and Charley's second serial begins when a frogman delivers a note, and the duo are sent in search of the formula for the Clumsy Drug, alongside Cyd Hayman as Madame Eloise Coqoutte. Corbett and Barker also play the two villains, the notorious Mr Greensleeves and his Japanese henchman Bobjob. In the end the mystery is solved as the formula is revealed on a pair of women's knickers. The endings for Death Can Be Fatal were based on more, as Corbett put it, 'exaggerated Dick Barton lines', such as "Is this the end for our two heroes? What of Madame Cocotte? Is she in some bedroom somewhere, lying in wait with a silencer? Or lying in silence with a waiter? Find out next week in another exciting episode, Villa of Villainy."

The Phantom Raspberry Blower of Old London Town (1976)

Written by Spike Milligan and Ronnie Barker but credited as "Spike Milligan and a Gentleman". Set in Victorian times, it is a Jack the Ripper parody in which a mysterious figure goes around blowing raspberries at members of the upper classes. The raspberries were done by Barker's friend David Jason. This entire section of sketches was included in Milligan's book "I Told You I Was Ill".

Stop! You're Killing Me (1977–78)
Piggy and Charley return as Devon's yokels are murdered and dumped in London, with support from Kate O'Mara as the gypsy temptress, Lucy Lee.

Sid and Lily, George and Edie (1978-79)
This is not so much a serial, but a series of sketches with the same characters that spanned series 7. Sid and George enjoy pints whilst discussing their wives Lily and Edie.

The Worm That Turned (1980)
Diana Dors guest-starred as the Commander of the State Police in this spoof piece of dystopian fiction set in 2012 in which women rule England. Male and female gender roles are completely reversed, even down to men having women's names and vice versa. Men are housekeepers and wear women's clothes, and law and order is managed by female guards in boots and hot pants. Big Ben is renamed Big Brenda, the Tower of London is renamed Barbara Castle and the Union Jack becomes the Union Jill. The watching of chauvinistic films is prohibited, so upset duo Janet and Betty prepare to escape to Wales. Available on YouTube.

Band of Slaves (1981–82)
The last serial to include Piggy Malone and Charley Farley, in which an all-girls orchestra is sold into white slavery by a demented Chinaman. Elizabeth Larner plays Mrs Bumstead, who notices a mysterious blind man appearing on the cruise ship. Location filmed on board P&O SS Canberra cruise out of Southampton. This concluded The Two Ronnies' serials collection, as the last three series did not include any.

Outside performers

Apart from Corbett and Barker, several actors from television appeared multiple times in the series, most notably John Owens and Claire Nielson, who appeared in twenty-one and seventeen episodes respectively throughout the series. Other frequent performers include April Walker, John Rutland, Michael Redfern, Jenny Logan, Alec Bregonzi, Carol Hawkins, Dilys Watling, Joyce Windsor, Julia McKenzie, Barbara New, Ian Gray, Johnnie Wade, Patricia Brake (who starred with Barker in the sitcom Porridge, which aired at the same time as the series), Josephine Tewson, Noel Dyson and Vicki Michelle. The Fred Tomlinson Singers appeared as background singers in twenty-five episodes.

As the series gathered more popularity, the sketches began to feature more famous and well-known British actors, including John Cleese, Patrick Troughton, Stratford Johns, Joan Sims, Patricia Routledge, Jenny Agutter and Lynda Baron, Ronnie Barker's co-star in Open All Hours.

Before achieving fame in the sitcom Hi-De-Hi, Barry Howard appeared in several early episodes as an uncredited extra. Other actors who appeared as extras before their rise to fame include Andrée Bernard and John Scott Martin.

Music
Another regular feature of the shows was an elaborate musical finale in which Barker and Corbett – often in drag – and company would sing a medley of songs in character, in barbershop, music hall, Gilbert and Sullivan or other styles, with the original words altered to suit whatever comic situation they were portraying. 

In the middle of the show, there would also be a cabaret musician or group appearing as a special guest, including Samantha Jones, Dana, Elkie Brooks, Manhattan Transfer, Pan's People, Michel Legrand, Barbara Dickson, Tina Charles, the Nolan Sisters, Elton John, New World, Elaine Paige and Phil Collins, the last of whom also took part in a few sketches.

Popularity
The programme became one of the most successful and long running light entertainment shows on British television, broadcast in the prime-time slot of 8 p.m. on a Saturday night, and at its peak, was watched by 18.5 million viewers a show. Following the departure of Morecambe and Wise from the BBC in 1978, The Two Ronnies became the BBC's flagship light entertainment programme, regularly gaining the top viewing figures in the critical Christmas Day audience battle. A memorable Radio Times cover for the extended Christmas issue in 1973 had both double acts appearing side by side.

Spin-offs and compilation series
In 1986 a multi-part compilation series titled Twenty Years of the Two Ronnies was aired, which featured the pair picking some of their classic sketches. It was followed by Twenty One Years of the Two Ronnies in 1987 and Twenty Two Years of the Two Ronnies in 1988.

The pair made no new shows after Christmas 1987, following Barker's decision to retire from show business. This was unknown to the audience and even the production team – the only person Barker told was Corbett, and they and their wives all went for a meal straight after the recording, keeping it a very low-key affair.

The Two Ronnies in Australia
The Two Ronnies was regularly screened in Australia on ABC Television, and was repeated several times. In 1986 the series was reported as being into its second or third airing, and being broadcast in a respectable time slot.

In 1979, a series was made for the Nine Network in Australia under the title of The Two Ronnies in Australia. It was followed by another series in 1986 with six episodes. These episodes contain many of the original sketches done for the BBC, but reworked for an Australian audience.

Parodies
The show was parodied twice by the Not the Nine O'Clock News team in 1982, with Mel Smith as Barker and Griff Rhys Jones as Corbett. One was as "The Three Ronnies", including footage of Ronald Reagan, at the time the President of the United States. The other controversially parodied them as "The Two Ninnies", a pastiche of their opening routine and a musical routine, using exaggerated innuendo, e.g. "Oh vagina, oh vagina, over Chinatown!" Barker in particular was quite offended by this sketch while Corbett was reportedly amused by it. The latter sketch was written by John Lloyd and Nigel Planer, while the writer of the song was Peter Brewis, who also wrote songs for The Two Ronnies.

The show is also briefly parodied in The Fast Show during a segment of a 'chanel 9' sketch set during a BAFTA style award ceremony. One of the nominations are 'The Twelve Ronnies', and a camera pans across a group of men dressed up to look like Corbett and Barker as they utter their famous 'it's goodbye from me' line in Chanel 9's nonsense language.

Adverts
Barker and Corbett also made a number of advertisements that appeared on ITV, including for British Leyland (Austin/Morris) in 1979 where Corbett played a villain on the run and, "needing some wheels", gets salesman Barker to show him round the Austin Morris range. They did a second ad in 1981, for the "BL Double Bonus" campaign, which featured Corbett playing a tax inspector inquiring as to why Barker is running four cars. They also did a series of ads for Hertz car rentals in the 1980s.

Revivals and comebacks
The show resurfaced in 1999 for a Two Ronnies Night. Ronnie Corbett also presented a Two Ronnies at the Movies special that same year. In 2000 A Tribute to the Two Ronnies was hosted by Ronnie Barker and Ronnie Corbett themselves.

In 2004 Barker announced that he and Corbett would return to make new episodes, entitled The Two Ronnies Sketchbook. This involved the two sitting at the newsdesk introducing their classic sketches. A Christmas special was recorded in July 2005 due to Barker's failing health.

Whilst the Sketchbook series was transmitted, The Two Ronnies was also the subject of an episode of the BBC documentary Comedy Connections. Ronnie Corbett, producers James Gilbert, Terry Hughes and Michael Hurll as well as writers Ian Davidson, Peter Vincent, David Renwick and Barry Cryer all spoke about the making of the series. Ronnie Barker did not appear, but excerpts from an interview he gave in 1997 were included.

On Ronnie Barker's death on 3 October 2005, Ronnie Corbett is reported to have said that throughout their many years of association there was never an angry word between them.

In September 2006, they were voted by the general public as Number 6 in a poll of TV's greatest stars.

As of 2012, full shows of The Two Ronnies are repeated on ITV3 and Gold. On 24, 25 and 26 December 2006, the ITV3 channel devoted the whole three days to the show interspersed with Ronnie Corbett's reminiscences of the show and Ronnie Barker. On 28 May 2007 many more episodes new to ITV3 were broadcast as well a showing of The Picnic and By the Sea.

DVD releases
The BBC Archives retains all episodes of The Two Ronnies in their entirety that were originally transmitted. In April 2007 (18 months after Barker's death), 2 Entertain began releasing The Two Ronnies on DVD in Britain. Series One and Two, including a definitive collection of their Christmas specials with segments from Christmas Night with the Stars, the Old-Fashioned Christmas Mystery and three other Christmas shows, were released on 30 April, 2 July and 29 October 2007.

As of 24 September 2012 with the release of The Picnic, By the Sea and The One Ronnie as part of The Complete Collection, every single episode has now been released on DVD.

The Two Ronnies were released in Region 4 (Australia) on the following dates: The Best of The Two Ronnies Volume 1 on 4 March 2002, The Best of The Two Ronnies Volume 2 on 17 March 2003, Series 1 on 4 July 2007, Series 2 (two discs) on 8 May 2008, Series 3 on 5 March 2009, Series 4 (two discs) on 4 August 2009, Series 5 on 4 March 2010 and Series 7 on 3 March 2011. The Two Ronnies in Australia was released on 28 June 2008 with all-region coding.

References

External links

 
  Comedy Guide
 
 
 

1970s British television sketch shows
1980s British television sketch shows
1971 British television series debuts
1987 British television series endings
BBC television sketch shows
British comedy duos